The Sailor Perugino is a 1924 German silent drama film directed by Frederic Zelnik and starring Anton Pointner, Heinz Schröder and Hans Brausewetter.

The film's sets were designed by the art director Georg Meyer.

Cast
 Anton Pointner
 Heinz Schröder
 Hans Brausewetter
 Josef Commer
 Albert Patry
 Frederic Zelnik

References

Bibliography
 Alfred Krautz. International directory of cinematographers, set- and costume designers in film, Volume 4. Saur, 1984.

External links

1924 films
Films of the Weimar Republic
German silent feature films
Films directed by Frederic Zelnik
German black-and-white films
1924 drama films
German drama films
Silent drama films
1920s German films
1920s German-language films